Semmler is a German surname. Notable people with the surname include:

Christoph Semmler (born 1980), German footballer
Clement Semmler, (1914–2000), Australian author, literary critic, broadcaster and radio and television executive
Friedrich Wilhelm Semmler (1836–1931), German chemist
Rudolf Semmler (born 1913), journalist
Stefan Semmler (born 1952), German rower

See also
Semmler-Wolff reaction
Semler

German-language surnames